Raniero Vanni d'Archirafi (born 7 June 1931) is a former Italian diplomat and European bureaucrat. He served as ambassador of Italy to Spain and the Federal Republic of Germany. He was also one of the European Commissioners of Italy.

Early life and education
Vanni D'Archirafi was born in Geneva on 7 June 1931. He has a bachelor's degree in law from the University of Rome. In 1954, he received a PhD in law.

Career
Vanni D'Archirafi began his career at the ministry of foreign affairs in 1956. In 1957, he served at the Italian Consulate in Munich. He became representative of Italy to the European Economic Community (ECC) in Brussels in 1961. From 1966 to 1969, he worked at the Italian embassy in Buenos Aires. He was Italian ambassador to Spain (1984-1987) and to the Federal Republic of Germany (1987-1989). In the latter diplomatic post he replaced Luigi Vittorio Ferraris. Vanni D'Archirafi's tenure ended in 1989 when Marcello Guidi was named as the Italian ambassador to the Federal Republic of Germany.

Then he began to serve as general director of economic affairs at the government led by Prime Minister Giulio Andreotti in 1989. Next he became general director of political affairs at the ministry of foreign affairs.

In 1993 Vanni D'Archirafi was nominated as a member of the European Commission. He served in the post until 1995. During this period, he was the European commissioner for internal market and services together with Martin Bangemann. Vanni D'Archirafi was responsible for enterprise policy as commissioner. 

He left politics after completing his tenure at the commission in January 1995. He is one of the EuropEFE Board of Directors.

Honors and awards
 Order of Merit of the Italian Republic 1st Class / Knight Grand Cross – 18 April 1990

In 1994, Vanni D'Archirafi was awarded the Robert Schuman medal.

See also
 Foreign relations of Italy

References

External links

20th-century Italian diplomats
1931 births
Ambassadors of Italy to Spain
Ambassadors of Italy to West Germany
Italian European Commissioners
Living people
Knights Grand Cross of the Order of Merit of the Italian Republic
Sapienza University of Rome alumni
Diplomats from Geneva